Eutychia is a female name of Greek origin which derives from the Ancient Greek name Εὐτύχιος (Eutychios), which originated from the Ancient Greek adjective εὐτυχής (eutyches) "the one whose fortune favors". Eutychia may refer to:

 Eutychia (now Zygaena), a genus of moths in the family Zygaenidae
 One of the Daughters of Philip of the Biblical Philip the Evangelist, according to Eusebius
 The mother of Saint Lucy, a third/fourth century martyr
 Another name of Euphrosyne, one of the Greek Charities and goddess of good cheer, joy, and mirth